Figure skating at the 1936 Winter Olympics took place at the Olympia-Kunsteisstadion in Garmisch-Partenkirchen, Bavaria, from 9 to 15 February 1936. Three figure skating events were contested: men's singles, ladies' singles, and pairs skating.

Medal summary

Medal table

Participating nations
Only three figure skaters (two men and one lady) competed in both the singles and the pairs event.

A total of 84 figure skaters (41 men and 43 ladies) from 17 nations (men from 16 nations and ladies from 16 nations) competed at the Garmisch-Partenkirchen Games:

  (men 6, women 6)
  (men 1, women 3)
  (men 3, women 3)
  (men 1, women 2)
  (men 1, women 1)
  (men 1, women 0)
  (men 3, women 4)
  (men 6, women 6)
  (men 4, women 3)
  (men 1, women 1)
  (men 4, women 1)
  (men 2, women 2)
  (men 1, women 3)
  (men 2, women 1)
  (men 0, women 1)
  (men 1, women 1)
  (men 4, women 5)

References

External links
 International Olympic Committee results database

 
1936 Winter Olympics events
1936
1936 in figure skating
Olympics 1936